Cornell Harvey is a politician in Georgia. He was the 59th Mayor of Brunswick, Georgia, serving from 2014 to early 2022, and was the first African-American to hold the position. Harvey is a member of the Democratic Party, and he served in the US Air Force.

Education
Harvey attended Glynn County Public Schools including Perry Elementary, Risley Elementary, Molette Jr. High, and Glynn Academy in Brunswick, Georgia. During his time in the Air Force, he received an associate degree in Systems Management from the Community College of the Air Force, a bachelor's degree in Systems Management from the University of Maryland, and a master's degree in Public Administration from Troy State University.

Military service
Harvey served in the United States Air Force for 29 years, enlisting in October 1971 and retiring in October 2000. In the course of his service, he attained the rank of Chief Master Sergeant (E-9).

References 

1953 births
African-American mayors in Georgia (U.S. state)
Living people
Mayors of places in Georgia (U.S. state)
Georgia (U.S. state) Democrats
People from Brunswick, Georgia
21st-century African-American people
20th-century African-American people